Edward Videl Jasper (January 18, 1973 – April 14, 2022) was an American professional football player who was a defensive tackle in the National Football League (NFL).  He was selected by the Philadelphia Eagles in the sixth round of the 1997 NFL Draft and played for the Eagles, Atlanta Falcons, and Oakland Raiders from 1997 to 2005.

Early life
Jasper was born in Tyler, Texas, on January 18, 1973.  He attended Troup High School, where he was a three-time All-East Texas and honored as Defensive Most Valuable Player.  He was also part of the school's basketball team that won the University Interscholastic League Class 2A state championship in 1992.

College career
After graduating from Troup, Jasper studied at Texas A&M University and played four seasons of college football for the Aggies.  In his first year with the team in 1993, the Aggies won the Southwest Conference (SWC) title, before losing 24–21 to Notre Dame Fighting in the 1994 Cotton Bowl Classic.  They finished 10–0–1 the following season, but were ineligible to defend their title.  The Aggies switched from the SWC to the Big 12 Conference during Jasper's senior year in 1996.  Although the team was 6–6 that season, he received honorable mention All-Big 12 honors.  He was also conferred the Aggie Heart Award, as voted for by his teammates.  He was subsequently drafted by the Philadelphia Eagles in the sixth round (198th overall selection) of the 1997 NFL Draft.

Professional career
Jasper made his NFL debut with the Eagles on September 15, 1997, at the age of 24, in a 21–20 loss against the Dallas Cowboys.  After two seasons with the franchise, he joined the Atlanta Falcons in 1999.  He had the most effective years of his career with the team, with arguably his best season coming in 2002, when he started all 16 games and helped the Falcons qualify for the playoffs that year.  The franchise also qualified for the playoffs two years later, advancing to the NFC Championship Game.  He went to the Oakland Raiders in 2005, where he tallied 2 sacks and 24 tackles in 15 games played.  He retired at the conclusion of the 2005 season.  During his nine-season NFL career, Jasper registered 250 tackles, 17 sacks, forced four fumbles, and made four fumble recoveries in 118 games played.

Personal life
Jasper's brother, Shane, served as president of the Troup Independent School District board.  Jasper died on April 14, 2022, at the age of 49.

References

1973 births
2022 deaths
American football defensive tackles
Texas A&M Aggies football players
Philadelphia Eagles players
Atlanta Falcons players
Oakland Raiders players
Players of American football from Texas
Sportspeople from Tyler, Texas
Ed Block Courage Award recipients